Punk Goes Crunk is the seventh compilation album in the Punk Goes... series released by Fearless Records. The album is composed of popular hip hop songs performed by various post-hardcore, metalcore and pop punk bands.  This is the first and (as of 2017) only Punk Goes... album to carry a Parental Advisory for the sexual, vulgar and sometimes violent nature of the songs. Both All Time Low's cover of "Umbrella" and Forever the Sickest Kids' cover of "Men in Black" were made available for streaming on March 6.

Track listing

References

Covers albums
Punk Goes series
2008 compilation albums
Crunk albums